Mihai Viteazu is a commune in Constanța County, Northern Dobruja, Romania. To the east are the shores of the Black Sea and of Lake Sinoe, while to the north is Tulcea County.

 Mihai Viteazu, named after the Wallachian prince Michael the Brave (historical name: Sariurt).
 Sinoe (historical names: Casapchioi).

The Eolica Mihai Viteazu Wind Farm (with a nominal output of up to 80 MW of power) is located on the territory of the commune.

Demographics
At the 2011 census, Mihai Viteazu had 3,244 inhabitants, of whom 2,881 were Romanians (94.83%), 3 Hungarians (0.10%), 148 Roma (4.87%), and 6 others (0.20%).

At the 1930 census, Mihai Viteazu had 1,720 inhabitants, of whom 1,576 (91.63%) were Bulgarians and 120 (6.98%) Romanians. In Sinoe, of 2,230 inhabitants, 2,136 (95.78%) were Bulgarians and 54 (2.42%) Romanians. The local Bulgarians left in 1940, during the population exchange between Bulgaria and Romania.

Notable natives
 Ovidiu Papadima (1909–1996), Romanian literary critic, folklorist, and essayist
 Viorel Talapan (b. 1972), Romanian rower

Gallery

References

Communes in Constanța County
Localities in Northern Dobruja